Todote is the Samoyed god of evil and death, identified with the Turkic god Erlik.

Siberian deities